The Delaware County Fairgrounds racetrack is a half-mile dirt racing oval for harness racing events in Delaware, Ohio operated by the Delaware County Agricultural Society since 1946. The most important race run here is the Little Brown Jug. The premier event in the United States for three-year-old pacers, it is the third and final leg of the Triple Crown of Harness Racing series.

Some of the other races contested at the Delaware County Fairgrounds racetrack are the Little Brown Jugette, the Buckette 3YO Filly Trot, the Ohio Breeders Championship races, the Old Oaken Bucket, and the Ms Versatility Final.

References

Horse racing venues in Ohio
Sports venues completed in 1946
Buildings and structures in Delaware, Ohio
Tourist attractions in Delaware County, Ohio
Sports in Delaware County, Ohio
Harness racing venues in the United States
1946 establishments in Ohio